The Pennsylvania Railroad's class L2s was a class of USRA Light Mikados originally purchased (1919) for the subsidiary Grand Rapids and Indiana Railroad. Similar in size to the home-designed and built L1s, the L2s was easily distinguishable by their radial-stay fireboxes and Hodges fabricated trailing trucks. They were built by ALCO. All were retired in 1948.

History
After World War I, the Pennsylvania Railroad needed a lighter 2-8-2 type steam locomotive to handle lighter freight trains on the system. In 1919, 38 locomotives (GR&I 106-112 and PRR 20006-20038) were purchased while the railroad was under USRA control. Alco, Baldwin, and Lima filled the order. Most were sold in 1923 (20006-20038) to the SLSF (Frisco) and MP (Missouri Pacific). Five were retained to run on the Grand Rapids & Indiana and renumbered in 1921 to PRR 9627-9631. All 5 locomotives 9627 to 9631 remaining with the Pennsy were photographed at some stage, most in the 1930s.

Retirement
The five locos remained in service through World War II, until being replaced and dropped from the roster between March and November 1948. Frisco 4018 (former PRR 20030) is displayed at Birmingham, Al.

Train model
LGB produced a USRA Light Mikado from 2001-2004 in G scale in multiple fallen flag railroad names including product number 21872, Pennsylvania Railroad No. 2809.
In HO scale, Märklin produced both a 2 rail version (TRIX brand) in 2004 (product ID 22804) and a 3-rail version (product ID 37976) in 2011. Both of these faithfully replicate the Pennsylvania lettering and paint scheme of the inter-war years.

References

L2s
2-8-2 locomotives
Steam locomotives of the United States
Scrapped locomotives
Standard gauge locomotives of the United States